Laitia Moceidreke (born 9 June 2000) is a professional rugby league footballer who plays as a er for the North Queensland Cowboys in the NRL.

Background 
Born in Camperdown, New South Wales, Moceidreke is of Fijian descent. He is the younger brother of former South Sydney Rabbitohs player Sitiveni Moceidreke.

He attended Matraville Sports High School and played his junior rugby league for the St George Dragons.

Playing career

Early career
In 2020, Moceidreke played for the Moorebank Rams in the Sydney Shield.

2021
In 2021, Moceidreke joined the Canterbury-Bankstown Bulldogs, playing for their Jersey Flegg Cup side.

In June, Moceidreke signed with the North Queensland Cowboys on a two-year deal beginning in 2022 but was granted an immediate release to join the club for the 2021 NRL season.

In round 23 of the 2021 NRL season, Moceidreke made his NRL debut for the North Queensland club against the Parramatta Eels, scoring a try in a 32-16 loss.

References

External links 
North Queensland Cowboys profile

2000 births
Living people
Australian rugby league players
Australian people of Fijian descent
North Queensland Cowboys players
Rugby league players from Sydney
Rugby league wingers